Gymnopilus patriae is a species of mushroom in the family Hymenogastraceae.

See also

List of Gymnopilus species

External links
Gymnopilus patriae at Index Fungorum

patriae
Fungi of North America